The Antichristmas Volume 1 is a compilation album of metal Christmas song parodies and instrumentals by members of the World Metal Alliance, released to the public via Cafepress on 7 December 2004. The album was re-released the following year as WMA Xmas Metal Volume 1 for several reasons, primarily for search engine optimization.

In 2005 the album was included in the article "Jingle Bell Schlock" by the Australian newspaper The Age.



Track listing 
 "Of None Effect" — 0:56
 "Dark Tradition In Full Swing" — 3:56
 "Beware" — 2:24
 "Spoiled Children Watch The Sky" — 3:18
 "With The Axe" — 1:16
 "O Dead Pine Tree" — 2:49
 "A Book That Is Sealed" — 1:15
 "Check The Balls' — 2:00
 "Turned Unto Fables" — 0:23
 "Some Red Clad Bearded Rental Men" — 4:43
 "Seven Vials Of Wrath" — 3:36
 "Woe To The World" — 3:46
 "Hark! The Herald Angels Sing" — 3:28
 "Angels We Have Heard On High" — 4:04
 "O Christmas Tree" — 3:00
 "Deck The Halls" — 2:00
 "God Rest Ye Merry Gentlemen" — 4:43
 "Joy To The World" — 3:46

Personnel
DarkOverlord — keyboard/vocals
Minister — guitar/vocals
TSAC — bass

References

See also
 World Metal Alliance

Heavy metal compilation albums
2004 Christmas albums
2000s comedy albums
Heavy metal Christmas albums